Eremaea acutifolia, commonly known as rusty eremaea, is a plant in the myrtle family, Myrtaceae and is endemic to the south-west of Western Australia. It is a small shrub with needle-like leaves and which bears orange-coloured flowers on short side branches and fruits with a surface that is rough to the touch.

Description

The flowers are usually orange, rarely dark pink and are on the ends of short side branches off the previous year's wood. The flowers occur singly, rarely two together. The stamens are arranged in 5 bundles, each containing 28 to 34 stamens. Flowering occurs from August to November and is followed by fruits which are woody capsules.

Taxonomy and naming
Eremaea acutifolia was first formally described in 1860 by Ferdinand von Mueller in Fragmenta Phytographiae Australiae. The specific epithet (acutifolia) is from the Latin acutus meaning "sharp" or "pointed" and folium meaning "a leaf" referring to the pointed leaves of this species.

Distribution and habitat
Eremaea acutifolia is only found in a small area east of Geraldton in the Avon Wheatbelt and Geraldton Sandplains biogeographic regions. It grows in sand on sandplains.

Conservation
Eremaea acutifolia is classified as "Priority Three" by the Western Australian Government Department of Parks and Wildlife meaning that it is poorly known and known from only a few locations but is not under imminent threat.

References

acutifolia
Myrtales of Australia
Plants described in 1860
Endemic flora of Western Australia
Taxa named by Ferdinand von Mueller